José Luis Alvarez del Monte (16 February 1931 – unknown) was a Uruguayan chess player, two-time Uruguayan Chess Championship winner (1965, 1968).

Biography
In the 1960s José Luis Alvarez del Monte was one of Uruguayan leading chess players. He twice won Uruguayan Chess Championships: 1965, and 1968. In 1961, he won silver medal in this tournament. José Luis Alvarez del Monte two times participated in World Chess Championship South American Zonal tournaments (1966, 1969) and once in Pan American Chess Championship (1966).

José Luis Alvarez del Monte played for Uruguay in the Chess Olympiads:
 In 1962, at third board in the 15th Chess Olympiad in Varna (+5, =5, -6),
 In 1964, at second board in the 16th Chess Olympiad in Tel Aviv (+5, =4, -4),
 In 1966, at first board in the 17th Chess Olympiad in Havana (+6, =10, -4).

References
The Gijon International Chess Tournaments, by Pedro Mendez & Luis Mendez . Edit. McFarland

External links

José Luis Alvarez del Monte chess games at 365chess.com

1931 births
Year of death missing
Uruguayan chess players
Chess Olympiad competitors
20th-century chess players